Galina Kamenova (born 16 September 1970) is a Bulgarian rower. She competed at the 1992 Summer Olympics and the 1996 Summer Olympics.

References

External links
 

1970 births
Living people
Bulgarian female rowers
Olympic rowers of Bulgaria
Rowers at the 1992 Summer Olympics
Rowers at the 1996 Summer Olympics
People from Vratsa